Heitz Place Courthouse is a historic courthouse building located at Hicksville in Nassau County, New York.  It was built in 1895 and is a two-story, hipped roof balloon frame building sheathed with clapboards.  It features full height pilasters, a full-length verandah, and an open octagonal cupola.

It was listed on the National Register of Historic Places in 1974.  The building is currently used to hold the collections of the Hicksville Gregory Museum.

References

Courthouses in New York (state)
Courthouses on the National Register of Historic Places in New York (state)
Government buildings completed in 1895
Buildings and structures in Nassau County, New York
National Register of Historic Places in Nassau County, New York